Barrios Unidos is the 12th locality of Bogotá, capital of Colombia. It is located to the northwest of the city, and is mostly inhabited by middle class residents. Barrios Unidos is completely urban, with some light industry and major commercial areas.

Geography 
Barrios Unidos borders
 North: Calle 100, bordering the locality of Suba
 South: Calle 63, bordering the locality of Teusaquillo
 East: Autopista Norte and Avenida Caracas, bordering the locality of Chapinero
 West: Avenida Carrera 68, bordering the locality of Engativá

Hydrology 
Several rivers from the Salitre system pass through Barrios Unidos, including the Salitre River.

Topography 
Barrios Unidos is relatively flat, located on the Bogotá savanna.

Transportation 
In addition to the avenues that border the locality, the principal roads that serve it are:
Avenida 80, Avenida Calle 68, Avenida NQS, and Carrera 24. Calle 80 and Avenida NQS both have lines of the TransMilenio system.

Economy 
Small-scale industry thrives in the area, and it is home to Bogotá's leather, furniture, and footwear districts. Factory direct storefronts are common throughout the locality. Specialty warehouses also exist, primarily focusing on autoparts.

Points of interest 
Part of Parque Metropolitano Simón Bolívar is located within Barrios Unidos:
 El Lago Park
 Centro de Alto Rendimiento (fine arts center)
 Salitre Mágico Park

Among the commercial establishments are:
 Cafam Floresta
 Metrópolis shopping center

Barrios Unidos also is home to the Escuela de Cadetes General Santander military school.

References

External links 
 
  National University of Colombia site about Barrios Unidos 

Localities of Bogotá